Broughton RFC is a rugby union club based in Edinburgh, Scotland.

History
The club was founded in 1924. The club was started by former pupils of Broughton School in Edinburgh, and the club was initially named Broughton F.P. RFC. The Edinburgh Evening News of 19 September 1924 reporting:
A F.P. rugby club has been started in connection with Broughton Secondary School, and fixtures are being arranged for two XVs. It is expected that the pitch will be available for home matches at Wardie. A cordial invitation to join is extended to all F.P.s and a meeting will held in the school on Monday first, at 7.30. Any honorary secretaries having vacant dates are invited to communicate with Mr Bauchope at the school.

Rugby at Broughton School was in a healthy position, particularly in comparison with association football. The Broughton F.P. name was also used by the analogous association football side. They had a longstanding connection with the Lothian Amateurs side but, on 2 October 1924, they had to break that connection as they could not get enough association football players from the school ranks; noting that the Broughton School's standard code was rugby union.

The rugby club's first match was on 24 October 1924. They played Linlithgow and were beaten 8–0; all of Linlithgow's points coming in the first half.

The women's team was started in 2009.

Sides
The club runs a men's and women's side. Both train on Tuesday and Thursday nights from 7pm at Wardie.

Sevens tournament
The club runs the Broughton Sevens.

Honours

Men's
 East Regional Bowl
 Champions (1): 2013
 Haddington Sevens
 Champions (4): 1932, 1937, 1938, 1948
 Edinburgh Northern Sevens
 Champions (3): 1960, 1962, 1963
 Kirkcaldy Sevens
 Champions (1): 1966
 Stirling Sevens
 Champions (1): 1967
 Corstorphine Athletics Sevens
 Champions (1): 1927

Women's
 National Bowl
 Champions (1): 2014
 Kirkcaldy Sevens
 Champions (1): 2016

Notable former players

Men

Edinburgh District
The following former Broughton RFC players have represented Edinburgh District.

Women

International players
The following former Broughton RFC players have been given a senior cap by their national side.
 Finland

Retired Jerseys

Men
The following former Broughton RFC jerseys have been retired out of respect to former greats.

References

Rugby union in Edinburgh
Scottish rugby union teams